Ring is the debut studio album by American musician Glasser (Cameron Mesirow), released on September 24, 2010 by True Panther Sounds. The album was critically acclaimed upon its release.

Track listing
"Apply" – 4:59
"Home" – 4:07
"Glad" – 2:23
"Plane Temp" – 4:21
"T" – 5:17
"Tremel" – 3:46
"Mirrorage" – 3:39
"Treasury of We" – 5:27
"Clamour" – 4:30

References

2010 debut albums
Glasser (musician) albums